Marcantonio II Colonna (sometimes spelled Marc'Antonio; 1535 – August 1, 1584), Duke of Tagliacozzo and Duke and Prince of Paliano, was a Roman aristocrat who served as a Viceroy of Sicily in the service of the Spanish Crown, Spanish general, and Captain General of the Church. He is best remembered for his part as the admiral of the Papal fleet in the Battle of Lepanto.

Biography
Marcantonio Colonna, born in 1535 at Civita Lavinia, was a member of the noble Colonna family of the Lazio, then one of the most powerful feudal dynasties of the Papal States and the Kingdom of Sicily, which was under Spanish rule. His parents were Ascanio Colonna, Duke of Tagliacozzo, and Giovanna d'Aragona.

Due to acts of rebellion, he was disinherited by his father; but in 1562 Colonna was able to regain the family fiefs for himself, largely thanks to the support of Pope Pius IV. However, he had to forfeit several possessions, such as Nemi, Ardea, and Civita Lavinia, due his father, Ascanio, having left little money.

In 1553–1554, during the war against Siena, Colonna was made commander of the Spanish cavalry. 
At the Battle of Lepanto (7 October 1571), he commanded the papal Capitana (flagship) as part of the Centre division, where he rescued the flagship of commander Don John of Austria, the Real. When the Real was almost taken by the Ottoman janissaries, Colonna came alongside, with the bow of his galley and mounted a counter-attack. With the help of Colonna, the Turks were pushed off the Real and the Ottoman flagship of Ali Pasha was boarded and swept. The entire crew of Ali Pasha's flagship was killed, including the commander himself. The banner of the Holy League was hoisted on the captured ship, breaking the morale of the Turkish galleys nearby.

On Colonna's return to Rome, Pope Gregory XIII confirmed him as Captain General of the Church.

In 1577 King Philip II named Colonna as Viceroy of Sicily. He was also Lord of Marino, then a village a few miles south of Rome, where the inhabitants honoured him with a great annual feast which still takes place today, under the name of "Sagra dell'uva".

Colonna often stayed at Avezzano, where he had a fountain built and added a new floor in the castle, as well as a creating a loggia by the Fucine Lake. Later in his life he moved to L'Aquila, where he lived in the house now called the Palazzo Porcinari.

He had seven children, including cardinal Ascanio Colonna, Fabrizio Colonna (the father of Marcantonio III Colonna and Filippo I Colonna) and countess Vittoria Colonna de Cabrera.

References

External links

 Biography (italian)

People from Lanuvio
Marcantonio II
1535 births
1584 deaths
16th-century Italian nobility
Viceroys of Sicily
16th-century condottieri
Spanish generals
Captains General of the Church
Military leaders of the Italian Wars
People of the Ottoman–Venetian Wars
Battle of Lepanto